This article contains a list of fossil-bearing stratigraphic units in the state of North Dakota, U.S.

Sites

See also

 Paleontology in North Dakota

References

 

North Dakota
Stratigraphic units
Stratigraphy of North Dakota
North Dakota geography-related lists
United States geology-related lists